Lagane e cicciari (or lagane e cirici, lagane e ceci) is a dish from the Calabria region of southeastern mainland Italy. It consists of lagane, a wide pasta with chickpeas, garlic, and oil.

References

Pasta dishes
Cuisine of Calabria
Chickpea dishes